Hylodidae, commonly known as giant Neotropical torrent frogs, is a family of frogs native to Brazil and northern Argentina.  Phylogenetic evidence suggests the Hylodidae being the sister group to the Alsodidae.

Megaelosia is one species that lost the ability to produce vocalizations which in turn are denoted as mute. Through observation of aggressive interactions, it was found that the species' vocal sacs are used for one form of their visual signaling and communication.

Diversity
The family contains 48 species in four genera:
 Crossodactylus Duméril and Bibron, 1841 (13 species)
 Hylodes Fitzinger, 1826 (26 species)
 Megaelosia Miranda-Ribeiro, 1923 (one species)
 Phantasmarana Vittorazzi, Augusto-Alves, Neves-da-Silva, Carvalho-e-Silva, Recco-Pimentel, Toledo, Lourenço, and Bruschi, 2021 (eight species)

References

 
Amphibian families
Taxa named by Albert Günther